The Kamyzyak (also: Кизань - Kizan) is a river of Astrakhan Oblast, Russia. It is a distributary of the Volga in the Volga delta in the Caspian Sea area. The city of Kamyzyak lies on its banks.

References

Rivers of Astrakhan Oblast
0Kamyzyak